Steamrail Victoria is a not-for-profit volunteer group established in 1965 to restore and operate historic locomotives and rolling stock used on the railways in Victoria, Australia. The main depot of the group is at the Newport Workshops ('West Block') in suburban Melbourne. In addition to operating railfan special trains and charters for private groups, the group also operates special steam trains in the Melbourne suburban area. Steamrail regularly tours the state, including participation in annual events such as the Ballarat Heritage Weekend (steam locomotive Y112 is used to shuttle between Ballarat and Sulky Gully/Lal Lal).  Steamrail Victoria also leases diesel locomotives to freight operators such as Southern Shorthaul Railroad (SSR) & Qube Logistics as required. Locomotives were also hired to El Zorro until they ceased trading.

The group has custody of a number of Victorian Railways steam locomotives, including the R, D3 and K classes; in addition to several diesel electric locomotives, and various suburban electric rolling stock. Heritage carriages include the wooden 'E' and  'W' types, steel air conditioned 'S' type carriages, and South Australian 'K' type steel stock.

Locomotives

Steam Locomotives

Diesel locomotives

Electric rolling stock

Locomotives

Swing Door electrics
Swing Door (train)

Tait electrics
Tait (train)

Passenger Carriages

E Cars

W Cars

K Cars

S Cars

N Cars

Special Carriages

See also
 Tourist and Heritage Railways Act

References

External links

 

Heritage railways in Australia
Railway museums in Victoria (Australia)